Coats may refer to:

People
Coats (surname)

Places
Coats, Kansas, US
Coats, North Carolina, US
Coats Island, Nunavut, Canada
Coats Land, region of Antarctica

Other uses
Coat (clothing), an outer garment
Coats' disease, a human eye disorder
Coats Mission, British military mission 1941–42
Coats Group, a multinational sewing and needlecraft supplies manufacturer
Coats Steam Car, American automobile manufactured 1922–23
Stewart-Coats, American automobile manufactured only in 1922
Cadet Organizations Administration and Training Service, a sub-component of the Canadian Forces Reserves

See also
Coat (disambiguation)
Coates (disambiguation)
Cotes (disambiguation)